Saffron Walden Rural District was a rural district in the county of Essex, England. It was created in 1894 and later enlarged by the addition of the parishes of Berden, Birchanger, Elsenham, Farnham, Henham-on-the-Hill, Manuden, Stansted Mountfitchet and Ugley from the disbanded Stansted Rural District. It was named after and administered from Saffron Walden.

Since 1 April 1974 it has formed part of the District of Uttlesford.

At the time of its dissolution it consisted of the following 31 civil parishes.

Arkesden
Ashdon
Berden
Birchanger
Chrishall
Clavering
Debden
Elmdon
Elsenham
Farnham
Great Chesterford
Great Sampford
Hadstock
Hempstead
Henham-on-the-Hill
Langley
Littlebury
Little Chesterford
Little Sampford
Manuden
Newport
Quendon and Rickling
Radwinter
Stansted Mountfitchet
Strethall
Ugley
Wenden Lofts
Wendens Ambo
Wicken Bonhunt
Widdington
Wimbish

Political history of Essex
Districts of England created by the Local Government Act 1894
Districts of England abolished by the Local Government Act 1972
Rural districts of England